The Institute of Archaeology (IA) is a constituent institute of the Chinese Academy of Social Sciences (CASS), based in Beijing, China. It was founded on 1 August 1950, as part of the Chinese Academy of Sciences. Its original 20 or so researchers came from the Beiping Research Academy and the Institute of History and Philology, Academia Sinica of the Republic of China. In 1977, the institute became part of the newly established CASS.

Academic departments
Department of Prehistoric Archaeology, established 1953
Department of Xia, Shang and Zhou Archaeology, established 1953
Research Department of Han to Tang Archaeology, established 1953
Research Center for Frontier Archaeology and Foreign Archaeology, established 2002
Center for Scientific Archaeology, established 1995
Archaeology Press, established 1955
Center for Archaeological Data and Information, established 1996

In addition, the Research Center for Ancient Civilizations and the Conservation and Research Center of Cultural Heritage are also affiliated with IA CASS. The institute is also responsible for the Department of Archaeology of the Graduate School of CASS.

Journals
The institute publishes several academic journals in Chinese:
Kaogu (Archaeology), monthly
Acta Archaeologica Sinica (Kaogu Xuebao), quarterly
 Kaoguxue jikan (Archaeology Periodicals), annually
 Kaoguxue cankao ziliao (aperiodically)
 Zhongguo kaoguxue nianjian (Annals of Chinese Archaeology)

It also publishes China's only English-language archaeological journal, Chinese Archaeology.

Major excavations
Banpo, in Xi'an, Shaanxi
Miaodigou, in Shan County, Henan
Qujialing, in Jingshan County, Hubei
Liuwan, in Ledu, Qinghai
Erlitou, in Yanshi, Henan
Yinxu, in Anyang, Henan
Fenghao, in Shaanxi
Eastern Zhou dynasty Luoyang, in Henan
Han dynasty Chang'an, in Shaanxi
Mancheng Han tomb in Hebei
Han and Wei dynasty Luoyang
Sui and Tang dynasty Daxing-Chang'an
Sui and Tang dynasty Luoyang
Khanbaliq, capital of the Yuan dynasty, in Beijing
Dingling Mausoleum of the Ming dynasty

List of directors
Zheng Zhenduo (deputy directors: Liang Siyong and Xia Nai)
Yin Da
Xia Nai
Wang Zhongshu (1982–1988)
Xu Pingfang (徐苹芳, 1988–1992)
Ren Shinan (任式楠, 1992–1998)
Liu Qingzhu (刘庆柱, 1998–2006)
Wang Wei (王巍, 2006–2017)
Chen Xingcan (陈星灿, 2017–present)

Other prominent archaeologists
Xu Xusheng, discoverer of the Erlitou culture
Zheng Zhenxiang, discovered the Shang Dynasty tomb of Fuhao
Chen Mengjia, authority on oracle bones and ancient Chinese bronzes
Guo Baojun
Huang Wenbi
Huang Zhanyue
Su Bingqi

References

External links
Official website

1950 establishments in China
Organizations based in Beijing
Research institutes in China
Organizations established in 1950
Chinese Academy of Social Sciences